The Tenpin Bowling Association of Wales (TBAW) is the national governing body for tenpin bowling in Wales. It is a member of the Fédération Internationale des Quilleurs and the European Tenpin Bowling Federation – the "European Zone" of the World Tenpin Bowling Association.
 
The TBAW organises leagues and tournaments, including qualifying competitions from which the top male and female players are invited to represent Wales in international competitions.

The Tenpin Bowling Association of Wales is based in Llanelli, Carmarthenshire.

References

Sports governing bodies in Wales
Bowling organizations